No abras la puerta (English: Don't open the door) is a 2014 Chilean telenovela produced, and currently being broadcast, by TVN.

Luz Valdivieso and Matías Oviedo were cast as the leading roles, while Gonzalo Valenzuela plays the antagonist.

Plot 
Some years before present time, Isabel Tobar (Luz Valdivieso) suffered and survived violence and mistreatment from her ex-boyfriend, Juan Pablo Olavarria (Gonzalo Valenzuela). After getting him out of her life, she was able to put herself back together and became a strong self-confident woman. She now helps and defends women who are going through the same abuse she once went through.

She doesn't seem to have time for love in her life, but she does have time for her beloved daughter Jacinta (María de los Ángeles López), whom she protects with all her might. Even though she isn't looking for Prince Charming, she finds him in Tomás (Matías Oviedo), a handsome Kung Fu instructor who falls for this brave and caring woman. But everything is not perfect: Juan Pablo Olavarría (Gonzalo Valenzuela), her ex-boyfriend, is back in Chile determined to get back the woman who escaped from him.

Now Isabel will have to choose among these two men, a seemingly renovated Juan Pablo or the kind and loving Tomás. Besides she will get to know very deeply the stories of different couples who try to save their relationships and love.

Cast 
Confirmed on June 17, 2014.

 Luz Valdivieso as Isabel Tobar Vidal
 Gonzalo Valenzuela as Juan Pablo Olavarria 
 Matías Oviedo as Tomás Campos
 Elisa Zulueta as Silvana Bunivic
 Fernando Kliche as Germán Tobar
 Magdalena Max-Neef as María Teresa Vidal de Tobar 
 Marcial Tagle as Claudio Gormaz
 María José Illanes as Daniela Sepúlveda
 Alejandra Fosalba as Carla Marambio
 Javiera Hernández as Laura Olavarria
 Claudia Pérez as Rosario Vega de García
 Víctor Montero as Antonio Garcia - Villain
 Delfina Guzmán as Victoria Edwards
 Verónica Soffia as Ignacia Tobar Vidal
 Diego Ruiz as Martín Vial - Villain
 Camila Hirane as Dominga Velasco
 Felipe Orellana as Rodrigo Campos
 María Luisa Mayol as Soledad Vivanco
 María de los Ángeles López as Jacinta Olavarria Tobar / Jacinta Spencer Tobar
 Franco Latorre as Antonio Garcia Vega Jr.
Carolina Arregui as Gladys Ortiz
 Camila Leyva as Mercedes "Meche" Vivanco
 Max Meriño as Isabel's Chief
 Matías Stevens as Robert Spencer

References 

2014 telenovelas
2014 Chilean television series debuts
Chilean telenovelas
Spanish-language telenovelas
Televisión Nacional de Chile telenovelas
2015 Chilean television series endings